Callaghan MacCarty, 3rd Earl of Clancarty (died 1676) was the second son of Donough MacCarty, 1st Earl of Clancarty. Callaghan was destined for a Catholic religious career and entered a seminary in France where his family was in exile during Cromwell's rule. When his elder brother died in the Battle of Lowestoft, and the 2nd Earl, his nephew, died in infancy, he unexpectedly left his religious institution, returned to Ireland, and assumed the title. He became a Protestant and married a Protestant wife. Late in life he converted back to Catholicism.

Birth and origins 
Callaghan was born in the late 1630s in County Cork, most likely at Blarney Castle or Macroom Castle, residences of his parents. He was the second son of Donough MacCarty and his wife Eleanor Butler. At the time of his birth, Callaghan's father was the 2nd Viscount Muskerry, but he would be advanced to Earl of Clancarty in 1658. His father was a member of the MacCarthy of Muskerry dynasty, a Gaelic Irish family descended from the kings of Desmond.

Callaghan's mother was the eldest sister of James Butler, 1st Duke of Ormond. Her family, the Butler dynasty, was Old English and descended from Theobald Walter, who had been appointed Chief Butler of Ireland by King Henry II in 1177. Callaghan's parents were both Catholic; they had married before 1641. Callaghan had two brothers and two sisters, who are listed in his father's article.

Irish wars 
While Callaghan was a child, his father, Lord Muskerry, in March 1642 joined the Confederates to defend the Catholic faith and, as he thought, the King. Muskerry commanded the Confederates' Munster army in the Irish Confederate Wars. In October 1645 Giovanni Battista Rinuccini, the papal nuncio arrived in Ireland and visited Macroom Castle where Callaghan and his family were living. Muskerry disagreed with Rinuccini's policies and resigned early in August 1647 from his command.

In May 1647 Muskerry sent Callaghan's elder brother, Cormac, with a regiment to France to serve Louis XIV. After Rinuccini had left Ireland on 23 February 1649, Muskerry took up arms again to resist the Cromwellian Conquest of Ireland. He fought to the bitter end and surrendered Ross Castle near Killarney to Edmund Ludlow on 27 June 1652, disbanding his 5000-strong army.

To guarantee his compliance with the terms, Muskerry gave one of his sons to Ludlow as hostage. This must have been Callaghan, aged about 14, as his eldest, Cormac, was away with his regiment in France and Justin, aged 9, was probably with his mother in exile, also in France.

Exile 
Muskerry was allowed to embark to Spain. The family's estates were lost in the Act of Settlement of 1652, passed by the English Rump Parliament on 12 August.

Some time before the fall of Ross Castle, Muskerry had sent his wife, Callaghan's mother, to safety in France. She was probably accompanied by Callaghan's youngest brother, Justin, and his sisters. His mother lived with her sister Mary Butler, Lady Hamilton, in the convent of the Feuillantines in Paris. In the late 1650s Callaghan entered a seminary in France.

On 27 November 1658 his father was created Earl of Clancarty by Charles II in Brussels, where the King was then in exile. By this advancement the title of Viscount of Muskerry became a subsidiary title of the family, which was given as a courtesy title to the Earl's heir apparent. Callaghan's elder brother Charles (or Cormac) was from there on styled Lord Muskerry.

Restoration 
At the Restoration, Callaghan, aged about 13, and his elder brother, Cormac, stayed behind in France, while his parents, his younger brother, Justin, and his sisters returned to the British Isles. Cormac stayed behind in Dunkirk with his regiment, whereas Callaghan continued to prepare for the priesthood in a French seminary, In 1662 his father, Earl Clancarty, recovered his estates in the Act of Settlement. By 1664 Callaghan was a student at the Irish College in Toulouse. This was a small school with historic links to Munster. It never had more than 12 students.

Earl of Clancarty 
On 4 March 1665, the Second Anglo-Dutch War broke out. Three months into the war, on 3 June 1665 O.S., his brother Charles, Lord Muskerry, was killed on the flagship, the Royal Charles, in the Battle of Lowestoft, the first major naval engagement of the war and an English victory. His brother had an infant son, also named Charles, who succeeded him as heir apparent and Viscount of Muskerry. However, their father, the 1st Earl, died two months later, on 4 August 1665, and the younger Charles succeeded as the 2nd Earl of Clancarty. The 2nd Earl died about a year later, on 22 September 1666, still an infant.

At this point Justin, the third son, expected to succeed as 3rd Earl, as Callaghan, being in holy orders, would be passed over, but Callaghan hearing of the opening of the succession decided to claim the title. He left his college at Toulouse and returned to Ireland, where he conformed to the established religion, leaving the Catholic Church and joining the Protestant Church of Ireland. He therefore succeeded as the 3rd Earl of Clancarty.

Marriage and children 
In 1667 Lord Clancarty, as he was now, married Elizabeth FitzGerald, sixth and youngest daughter of George FitzGerald, 16th Earl of Kildare and his wife Lady Joan Boyle. The FitzGeralds were an Old English family whose ancestor came to Ireland during the Norman invasion of that country. His wife has been described as "a fierce Protestant isolated in a Catholic family".

 
Callaghan and Elizabeth had one son:
Donough (1668–1734), became the 4th and last Earl of Clancarty

—and four daughters of whom three are known by name:
Catharine, married Paul Davys, 1st Viscount Mount Cashell
Margaret, died childless
Elizabeth, died childless

Death, succession, and timeline 
Clancarty died of a stroke ("Apoplexy") on 21 November 1676 in Dublin, aged about 38. He died "out of the community of the Church of England" and seemed to have returned to his original Catholic religion some time after his marriage. He was buried in Christ Church Cathedral, Dublin. He was succeeded by his only son Donough, aged eight at the time. His widow remarried to Sir William Davys, Lord Chief Justice of Ireland, and died in 1698.

Notes and references

Notes

Citations

Sources 
Subject matter monographs:
Click here. Creighton in Dictionary of Irish Biography

 
  (for MacCarty)
  – (for Ormond)
 
  – 1643 to 1660
 
 
  – L to M (for Mountcashel)
  – Canonteign to Cutts (for Clancarty)
 
  – 1649 to 1782
  – Scotland and Ireland
  – 1625 to 1655
 
 
 
  – Blood royal, dukes, earls (for Earl of Kildare)
  – Viscounts (for Thurles)
 
 
 
 
  – (Snippet view)
  – Irish stem
 
 
 
  – (for his father)

 

1640s births
1676 deaths
Converts to Protestantism from Catholicism
Converts to Roman Catholicism from Anglicanism
Earls of Clancarty
Irish Christian monks
MacCarthy dynasty
People from County Cork